This is a list of 100 views of nature decided upon by the "Kansai Global Environment Forum" in Japan for their natural beauty, history and cultural significance.

Summary

See also
 List of Historic Sites of Japan (Ōsaka)

References

Historic Sites of Japan
Tourist attractions in Japan
Places of Scenic Beauty